Cundall is a multi-disciplinary engineering consultancy established in 1976 by Michael Burch, Rick Carr, Geoff Cundall, David Gandy, and Bernard Johnston. Founded in Newcastle and Edinburgh, Cundall now has United Kingdom offices in London, Newcastle, Edinburgh, Birmingham, Belfast, and Manchester, with Australian offices in Sydney, Perth, Melbourne, and Adelaide; Asian offices in Hong Kong, Shanghai, and Singapore; Middle East and North African (MENA) offices in Dubai, Doha, and Tripoli, and European offices in Dublin, Bucharest, Paphos, Madrid, and Wroclaw.

In 2016, Cundall won the Consultant of the Year award at the Construction News Awards, as organised by Construction News.

Awards
The Construction Skills Cut the Carbon Award, 2013 The Building Awards.
The open BIM Build Qatar Live, 2012 Build Qatar Live.
The Legacy Award – Sustainability, 2012 West Midland Centre for Consulting Excellence.
Consultancy Practice of the Year, 2012 Constructing Excellence in the North East Awards.
Australia's Zero Carbon Sustainable house: Collaborative Future, 2012 Zero Carbon Challenge.
Romania Green Building Council Awards, two awards:
Sustainable Company of the Year, 2011.
Green Service Provider of the Year, 2011.
Sustainable Consultant of the year award, 2010 Building Sustainability Awards.
Most Sustainable Remediation Project, 2010 Remediation Innovation Awards
Research, Studies and Consulting Award, 2010 ACE Engineering Excellence awards.
Cadbury Bournville Place, two awards:
2009 British Council for Offices (BCO) Awards, Corporate Workplace, Regional Award.
2009 Royal Institute of British Architects (RIBA) Award, West Midlands Region.
David Clark awarded the 2008 Sustainability Champion of the year award, UK Sustainable Building Services Awards 2008.
180 Great Portland Street, London, 2008 British Council for Offices (BCO) Awards, Innovation category.
ISG Headquarters, Aldgate House, London. Three major awards at the 2007 British Council for Offices (BCO) Awards.
Best of the best award 
National award, fit-out of workplace 
Regional award, London, fit-out of workplace

Selected projects

United Kingdom
2 Snow Hill, Birmingham
BA Waterside, Harmondsworth, London
Centre Point, London
UK Astronomy Technology Centre, Edinburgh
Vodafone headquarters building, Newbury
Excelsior Academy, Newcastle
Mann Island Buildings, Liverpool
One Hyde Park, London
Sage Group headquarters building, Newcastle
Wellcome Trust Gibbs Building, Euston Road, London
Lambeth Academy, London
University of St Andrews Arts Faculty Building, St Andrews
Cadbury Bournville Place, Bournville, Birmingham
New Street Square, London
Capital One, Loxley House, Nottingham
Durham Gateway, Durham University, Durham
Tyneside Cinema, Newcastle
Bede Academy, Northumberland
Aston University Engineering Academy, Birmingham

Australia
1 Bligh Street, Sydney
St Leonard's College (Melbourne) Sustainability Centre, Melbourne
480 Queen Street, Brisbane
30 The Bond, Sydney
Coca-Cola Place, Sydney
Mildura Airport, Victoria (Australia)
Royal Children's Hospital, Melbourne
Sydney Airport, Sydney
Westfield Sydney, Sydney
Milson Island Recreation Centre, New South Wales
Rouse Hill Town Centre, Sydney
Ravenswood School for Girls, Sydney

MENA
Deloitte Emaar Square, UAE
Desert Canyon Resort, UAE
Dubawi Island, UAE
Jumeirah Zabeel Saray, UAE
Nurai Island, UAE
Porto Dubai Island, UAE
Regulation and Supervision Bureau (RSB) Office, UAE
Tiara United Towers, UAE
TNS, Makeen Tower, UAE
Libyan European Hospital, Libya
Santa Monica Beach Resort, Boa Vista Island, Cape Verde

Europe
General Electric Headquarters, Madrid, Spain
Paris Data Centre, Paris, France
Bukowice – Low energy detached house, Bokowice, Poland
Stara Mennica, Warsaw, Poland
Facebook Luleå, Luleå, Sweden
Colosseum Shopping Centre, Bucharest, Romania
Cultural Buildings, Tasnad Refurbishment, Tasnad, Romania
Dealul Lomb, Cluj, Romania
Hampton Hotel, Brasov, Romania
Italiana 24, Bucharest, Romania
Vatra Dornei Hotel, Vatra Dornei, Romania

Asia
Shenzen Office Building, Hong Kong
Eaton Hotel Chiller Replacement, Hong Kong
Happy Valley Data Centre, Hong Kong
Hong Kong Children's Hospital, Hong Kong 
Hong Kong Science Park, Phase 3, Hong Kong
Jurong Data Centre, Jurong, Singapore
Ascendas iHub Suzhou, Suzhou, China
Corporate fit-out, Shanghai, China
Da Zhongli, Shanghai, China
Hakkasan, Shanghai, China
HASSELL Shanghai Studio, China
MGM MACAU, Macau, China
UNICO Restaurant at The Bund, Shanghai, China
Taiwan Tower International Competition, Taichung, Taiwan

Gallery

References

External links

Official site

Construction and civil engineering companies of the United Kingdom
Engineering consulting firms of the United Kingdom
International engineering consulting firms
Companies based in Newcastle upon Tyne
Construction and civil engineering companies established in 1976
1976 establishments in England